James Hamilton (born 16 August 1906) was a Scottish professional footballer who played for Girvan Juniors, Hamilton Academical, Ayr United, Rochdale, Wrexham, Carlisle United and Chester, as a full back.

References

1906 births
Date of death missing
Scottish footballers
Hamilton Academical F.C. players
Ayr United F.C. players
Rochdale A.F.C. players
Wrexham A.F.C. players
Carlisle United F.C. players
Chester F.C. players
Scottish Football League players
English Football League players
Association football fullbacks